Schiavi di Abruzzo is a hill town in the province of Chieti, Abruzzo, central Italy. It is located in the Apennine Mountains, in the southernmost portion of the Abruzzo region, on border with the Molise region.

Geography
Three quarters of the population lives in these surrounding valleys.

Heavy snowfall can occur in winter months.

Language and dialect
The town has a historical Italian dialect known as Schiavese. For many centuries there have been different dialects even between towns in the same vicinity. With the advent of television, the dialects have become less prevalent.

Population 

The population in 1861 was 3,657. As was the case of the rural areas of Southern Italy, the town experienced a mass immigration (Italian diaspora) to North and South America between 1861 and 1914. This immigration lead an abrupt decline of the agricultural economy.

Nonetheless the population peaked in 1961 at 4,526. Since then there has been a steady decline due to residents having sought employment in the Italian cities (mostly Rome), and also throughout Europe.

History
The first written mention of the town dates back to Middle Ages, in the first half of the 11th century. Also, the name Schavis and Sclavi appeared in the Libro delle decime (tithe book) of 1309 and of 1328. It is commonly known that there was a colony of Slavs that became a fief of Roberto da Sclavo, from which the name of the town was probably derived.

From 1130 the town was part of the Kingdom of Sicily, and later of Kingdom of Naples.

From 1626 until 1806 the town was also a fief of the Caracciolo di SantoBuono

From 1816 to 1861, Schiavi was part of the Kingdom of Two Sicilies, then becoming part of the Kingdom of Italy, until 1946 when Italy became a republic.

People
 Almerindo Portfolio, treasurer of New York City  
 Auro D'Alba, poet. See a poem he wrote about Schiavi.

Main sights
Templi Italici archaeological site. Known as the Templi Italici, referring to the Italic people of whom the Samnites, who lived here before the Roman conquest, were a subgroup.
Purgatorio Park, including walks among pine trees.
A replica of the Grotto of the Madonna of Lourdes is being constructed in the valley just below the town and the Italic Temples.

Transportation
There is daily bus service from Rome's Roma Termini railway station that takes about four hours.

By car from Rome, it takes about three hours via the A1 tollroad (Autostrade of Italy) south, in the direction of Naples. After 146 km (60 minutes) and just past Cassino, taking the San Vittore del Lazio exit, and following the signs to Isernia for 36 km (45 minutes) on state SS85. At Isernia, following signs to Vasto, and proceeding 35 km (45 minutes) on state road SS650, to the Schiavi di Abruzzo exit. SS650 is along the Trigno river and is generally at sea level. So from the exit, the road proceeds up the mountain side 13 km (20 minutes) with a  elevation change. To see road map, click here.

References

External links
 Municipal website

 Archeological details of the Italic Temple by the regional cultural heritage authority (in Italian)

 Schiavi Links for USA
History (in Italian):  Schiavi di Abruzzo, Documenti e Storia, edited by L. Porfilio and P. Falasca, 1994
 Local wind power installation (in Italian)

Cities and towns in Abruzzo